Shri Mata Vaishno Devi Katra railway station (station code: SVDK) is a railway station on the Jammu Udhampur Srinagar Baramulla Railway Link in the Indian Union Territory of Jammu and Kashmir. It mainly serves for the town of Katra where the major hindu divine temple Shri Mata Vaishno Devi is situated which is visited by millions of travellers per month with the help of this station and its frequent special trains connectivity from all over India. The station belongs to the Firozpur division of Northern Railway zone in Jammu and Kashmir.

History
In 1898, Maharaja Prathap Singh first explored to connect Jammu with Srinagar. But due to non-co ordination and other reasons, it stopped. 

In April 2005, the Jammu Udhampur Srinagar Baramulla Railway Link was completed up to Udhampur railway station from Jammu side and up to Banihal railway station from Srinagar side. Pirpanjal railway tunnel was completed and testing was being conducted in 2012. The rail link was inaugurated by Prime Minister Narendra Modi on 4 July 2014 at 10:00 A.M. This means that Katra is currently the northern terminus of the southern section of the Jammu–Baramulla line as well as the northernmost place accessible on the contiguous network of Indian Railways

A 1 megawatt solar power plant was commissioned at the station in March 2015.

Passenger amenities and facilities

The ground floor of Katra railway station has escalators, lifts, current reservation, second class booking, train enquiry section, pilgrim guide, tourist assistance, VIP lounge, a fully air-conditioned hotel with a shopping lounge, multi-cuisine restaurant, cloak room, waiting hall, a book stall, tea stall, toilet blocks, and catering area. The first floor accommodates eight retiring rooms and a cafeteria. A huge parking place has also been constructed to accommodate cars and passenger buses.

Being a modern railway station. Katra Railway station is equipped with modern facilities.

See also

 Banihal railway station
 Jammu–Baramulla line
 Northern Railways
 List of railway stations in Jammu and Kashmir

References

External links

  Indian Railways
Facilities at Katra Railway station

Railway stations in Reasi district
Firozpur railway division
2014 establishments in Jammu and Kashmir
Railway stations in India opened in 2014
Transport in Katra, Jammu and Kashmir